The Torneo Zonal, the second division of Peruvian football (soccer) in 1992, was played by 37 teams. the tournament winner, Ovación Sipesa was promoted to the 1992 Torneo Descentralizado's Hexagonal Final and 1993 Torneo Descentralizado. The tournament was played on a home-and-away round-robin basis.

History
In 1991, the Peruvian Football Federation decided to play the last of the Torneo Regionales of 44 teams to go back to have a tournament of 16 teams for the 1992 Torneo Descentralizado.

The teams descended of the 1991 Torneo Descentralizado, would play the Torneo Zonal with the teams of the Peruvian Primera División

The champion of the tournament would play the 1992 Torneo Descentralizado's Hexagonal Final by a place to the 1993 Copa CONMEBOL or to the 1993 Copa Libertadores, besides would play with the runner-up in the 1993 Torneo Descentralizado.

1992 Torneo Zonal

Zonal I

Zonal II

Zonal III

Zonal IV

Final Group

External links
 RSSSF

2
Peru